This is a list of notable female mixed martial arts fighters in alphabetical order.

A
  Mariya Agapova - (UFC, Invicta)
  Jessica Aguilar - (UFC, Bellator, WSOF)
  Hitomi Akano - (M-1, Strikeforce, Pancrase, JEWELS, Smackgirl, Invicta)
  Alexandra Albu - (UFC)
  Irene Aldana - (UFC, Invicta)
  JJ Aldrich - (UFC, Invicta)
  Reiko Amano
  Alyse Anderson - (OneFC)
  Megan Anderson - (Invicta, UFC)
  Jessica Andrade - (UFC)
  Nina Ansaroff - (UFC, Invicta)
  Viviane Araújo - (UFC) 
  Glena Avila
  Julia Avila - (UFC, Invicta)
  Diana Avsaragova - (Bellator)

B
  Jorina Baars - (OneFC)
  Maycee Barber - (UFC, Legacy)
  Shayna Baszler - (EliteXC, ShoXC, Strikeforce, Invicta, UFC)
  Diana Belbiţă - (UFC)
  Amanda Bell - (Invicta, Bellator)
  DeAnna Bennett - (Invicta, UFC) 
  Julia Berezikova - (M-1, SFL)
  Lucie Bertaud - (Bellator, Titan FC)
  Jemyma Betrian
  Erin Blanchfield - (UFC, Invicta)
  Arlene Blencowe - (Bellator)
  Mara Romero Borella - (UFC, Invicta)
  Poliana Botelho - (XFC, UFC)
  Amber Brown - (Invicta, KOTC, Pancrase)
  Annalisa Bucci - (KOTC, Bellator)
  Alexandra Buch - (JEWELS)
  Julia Budd - (Bellator, Invicta, Strikeforce)

C
  Priscila Cachoeira - (UFC)
  Joanne Calderwood - (UFC, Invicta, CWFC, SFL)
  Cynthia Calvillo - (UFC, LFA)
  Gina Carano - (EliteXC, Strikeforce)
  Ariane Carnelossi - (UFC)
  Cortney Casey - (UFC, XFC)
  Alex Chambers - (JEWELS, Invicta, UFC)
  Liz Carmouche - (UFC, Strikeforce, Invicta, Bellator)
  Macy Chiasson - (UFC)
  Jennifer Chieng -  (Bellator, Invicta)
  Katlyn Chookagian - (UFC, CFFC)
  Monika Chochlikova - (Bellator)
  Hannah Cifers - (UFC)
  Jasminka Cive - (KSW, Invicta)
  Heather Clark - (UFC, Bellator, XFC)
  Marloes Coenen - (DREAM, Strikeforce, Invicta, Smackgirl, Shooto, Bellator)
  Mayra Conde - (Smackgirl)
  Alexa Conners - (Invicta)
  Amanda Cooper - (UFC, Invicta)
  Bethe Correia - (Jungle Fight, UFC)
  Tracy Cortez - (Invicta, UFC)
  Kim Couture - (Strikeforce, XFC)
  Ashley Cummins - (Invicta)
  Kailin Curran - (UFC)
  Cris Cyborg - (EliteXC, Strikeforce, Invicta, UFC, Bellator)

D
  Sarah D'Alelio - (Invicta, BAMMA USA, Pancrase)
  Aisling Daly - (Invicta, Bellator, Cage Rage, CWFC, UFC)
  Cindy Dandois - (UFC, Invicta, Rizin FF, PFL)
  Sunna Davíðsdóttir - (Invicta)
  Alexis Davis - (UFC, Strikeforce, Invicta)
  Jillian DeCoursey - (Invicta)
  Jéssica Delboni - (Invicta)
  Mackenzie Dern - (Legacy, UFC)
  Shana Dobson - (UFC)
  Julia Dorny - (IMMAF)
  Emily Ducote - (Bellator, Invicta)
  Milana Dudieva - (UFC, Invicta)
   Faith Van Duin - (Invicta)
  Jessamyn Duke - (UFC, Invicta)
  Norma Dumont - (UFC)

E
  Stephanie Eggink - (Invicta, XFC)
  Lisa Ellis - (Smackgirl, Invicta, Bellator, DEEP, UFC)
  Bolormaa "Esui" Erdenebileg - (JEWELS)
  Jodie Esquibel - (Invicta, UFC)
  Carla Esparza - (UFC, Invicta, Bellator, XFC)
  Sijara Eubanks - (UFC, Invicta)
  Ashlee Evans-Smith - (UFC, WSOF)
  Tonya Evinger - (EliteXC, ShoXC, Invicta, Titan FC, UFC)
  Jessica Eye - (UFC, Bellator)

F

  Genah Fabian - (PFL)
  Melinda Fabian - (UFC) 
  Stamp Fairtex - (OneFC)
  Kalindra Faria - (UFC) 
  Christine Ferea - (Invicta)
  Jan Finney - (Strikeforce, ShoXC, KOTC, PFC)
  Manon Fiorot - (UFC)
  Stephanie Frausto - (Bellator, Invicta, TPF)
  Jinh Yu Frey - (UFC, Invicta, Rizin FF, Road FC)
  Ania Fucz
  Megumi Fujii - (Sengoku, Bellator, JEWELS, Shooto, Smackgirl, VTJ)
  Emi Fujino - (Sengoku, JEWELS, Smackgirl, WSOF)

G
  Cláudia Gadelha - (UFC, Invicta)
  Sheila Gaff - (M-1, CWFC, UFC, XFC-i)
  Priscilla Hertati Lumban Gaol - (One FC)
  Gabi Garcia - (Rizin FF)
  Stephanie Geltmacher - (Invicta, Bellator)
  Alexa Grasso - (UFC, Invicta)
  Alida Gray - (WSOF, Invicta)
  Minna Grusander - (Invicta)
  Ediane Gomes - (KOTC, Invicta)
  Pearl Gonzalez - (UFC, Invicta)
  Zoila Frausto Gurgel - (Invicta, Bellator, Strikeforce, TPF, RFA)

H
  Claire Haigh
  Seo Hee Ham - (UFC, Smackgirl, DEEP, JEWELS, Road FC, One)
  Ayaka Hamasaki - (JEWELS, Rizin, Invicta, Shooto)
  Kay Hansen - (UFC, Invicta)
   Janay Harding - (Bellator)
  Heather Hardy - (Bellator)
  Kayla Harrison - (PFL)
  Takayo Hashi - (Smackgirl, JEWELS, Strikeforce, Invicta)
  Angela Hill - (UFC, Invicta)
  Itsuki Hirata (One)
  Felice Herrig - (UFC, Bellator, XFC)
  Munah Holland - (Bellator, Invicta)
  Holly Holm - (Bellator, Legacy, UFC)
  Barb Honchak - (Invicta, KOTC, UFC)
  Ikuma Hoshino - (Smackgirl, Shooto)
  Yumiko Hotta - (DEEP, VTJ)

I
  Daria Ibragimova - (Invicta)
  Mai Ichii - (DEEP, JEWELS, Smackgirl)
  Mizuki Inoue - (JEWELS, DEEP, Invicta)
  Kikuyo Ishikawa - (JEWELS, Pancrase)
  Saori Ishioka - (Smackgirl, JEWELS, Pancrase, DEEP)

J
  Sharon Jacobson - (Invicta)
  Virna Jandiroba - (UFC, Invicta)
  Joanna Jędrzejczyk - (UFC, CWFC)
  Adrienna Jenkins - (WEC, HOOKnSHOOT, Bellator)
  Liana Jojua - (UFC, Kunlun)
  Jocelyn Jones-Lybarger - (UFC, Invicta, RFA, KOTC)
  Ana Julaton - (OneFC, Bellator)

K
  Emily Kagan - (UFC, Invicta)
  Mari Kaneko - (Smackgirl, JEWELS, DEEP)
  Katja Kankaanpää - (CWFC, Invicta)
  Anita Karim - (OneFC)
  Nadia Kassem - (UFC)
  Sarah Kaufman – (Invicta, KOTC, PFC, Strikeforce, UFC)
  Julie Kedzie - (KOTC, ShoXC, Strikeforce, EliteXC, UFC)
  Amanda Kelly - (CWFC)
  Pannie Kianzad - (UFC, CWFC, Invicta)
  Denise Kielholtz - (Bellator)
  Ji Yeon Kim - (UFC)
  Kyoko Kimura - (Pancrase)
  Justine Kish - (RFA, UFC)
  Asami Kodera - (Smackgirl, JEWELS)
  Syuri Kondo - (UFC)
  Yuuki Kondo - (Smackgirl)
  Karolina Kowalkiewicz - (UFC, Invicta, KSW)
  Rena Kubota - (JEWELS, Rizin FF)
  Yana Kunitskaya - (Invicta, UFC)
  Mina Kurobe - (JEWELS, Shooto)

L
  Aspen Ladd - (Invicta, UFC) 
  Lina Länsberg - (UFC)
  Alejandra Lara - (Bellator)
  Tara LaRosa - (Invicta, Smackgirl)
  Andrea Lee - (Invicta, LFA, UFC)
  Angela Lee - (ONE)
  Victoria Lee - (ONE)
  Katharina Lehner - (Invicta, Bellator)
  Amber Leibrock - (Invicta, Bellator)
  Lei'D Tapa - (Rizin)
  Valérie Létourneau - (UFC, Bellator)
  Becky Levi - (DEEP)
  Su Jeong Lim
  Juliana Lima - (UFC, Invicta)
  Ariane Lipski - (UFC, KSW)
  Loma Lookboonmee - (UFC, Invicta)
  Amanda Lucas - (DEEP)

M
  Ilima-Lei Macfarlane - (Bellator)
  Angela Magaña - (UFC)
  Veronica Macedo - (UFC)
  Valesca Machado - (Invicta)
  Tomo Maesawa - (JEWELS, Rizin)
  Jennifer Maia - (Invicta, Cage Warriors, UFC)
  Bea Malecki - (UFC)
  Randa Markos - (RFA, UFC)
  Christina Marks - (UFC)
  Miranda Maverick - (Invicta, UFC)
  Elaina Maxwell - (Strikeforce)
  Gina Mazany - (UFC)
  Sabina Mazo - (UFC)
  Molly McCann - (UFC, Cage Warriors)
  Liz McCarthy - (Invicta)
  Danni McCormack - (Bellator)
  Leah McCourt - (Bellator, Cage Warriors)
  Sara McMann - (Titan FC, Invicta, UFC)
  Kaline Medeiros - (Bellator, Invicta)
  Vanessa Melo - (UFC)
  Randi Miller - (Invicta)
  Reina Miura - (DEEP, Rizin)
  Roxanne Modafferi - (KOTC, Strikeforce, Cage Warriors, Shooto, Smackgirl, JEWELS, Invicta, UFC)
  Yasuko Mogi - (Shooto, Smackgirl, JEWELS)
  Marina Mokhnatkina - (Fight Nights Global, Bellator)
  Nicco Montaño - (UFC, KOTC) 
  Janaisa Morandin - (Invicta)
  Sarah Moras - (UFC, Invicta, CWFC)
  Peggy Morgan - (Invicta, UFC)
  Maryna Moroz - (UFC, XFC-i)
  Jamie Moyle -  (UFC, Invicta)
  Lauren Mueller - (UFC)
  Lauren Murphy - (UFC, Invicta)
  Serin Murray - (Smackgirl)

N
  Mika Nagano - (Smackgirl, JEWELS, DEEP)
  Jujeath Nagaowa - (OneFC)
  Miriam Nakamoto - (Invicta)
  Rose Namajunas - (UFC, Invicta)
  Michelle Nicolini - (OneFC)
  Agnieszka Niedźwiedź - (Invicta, Cage Warriors)
  Talita Nogueira - (Bellator)
  Sakura Nomura - (JEWELS)
  Amanda Nunes - (Invicta, Strikeforce, UFC)

O
  Saori Oshima - (Shooto, Jewels)
  Ann Osman - (OneFC)
  Rachael Ostovich - (Bellator, UFC, Invicta)
  Lena Ovchynnikova - (Bellator, SFL)
  Hatice Ozyurt - (Bellator, BAMMA)

P
  Raquel Pa'aluhi - (Invicta)
  Stephanie Ielö Page
  Si Woo Park - (Road FC, Jewels)
  Julianna Peña - (UFC)
  Jessica Penne - (Invicta, Bellator, UFC)
  Raquel Pennington - (Invicta, UFC)
  Viviane Pereira - (XFC-i, UFC)
  Elizabeth Phillips - (UFC, Invicta)
  Ritu Phogat - (OneFC)
  Livia von Plettenberg - (Invicta)
  Vanessa Porto - (Invicta, Jungle Fight, Bellator)
  Lucie Pudilova - (UFC)
  Debi Purcell - (KOTC, ShoXC, Smackgirl)

R

  Jessica Rakoczy - (Bellator, TPF, UFC)
  Germaine de Randamie - (UFC, Strikeforce)
  Alyona Rassohyna - (OneFC)
  Bec Rawlings - (UFC, Invicta)
  Elena Reid - (Bellator)
  Marion Reneau - (UFC, TPF)
  Amanda Ribas - (UFC)
  Nicdali Rivera-Calanoc - (Invicta)
  Angela Rivera-Parr
  Gillian Robertson - (UFC)
  Irina Rodina
  Cassie Rodish - (Invicta)
   Karina Rodríguez - (Invicta)
   Marina Rodriguez - (UFC)
  Montana De La Rosa - (UFC, Legacy)
  Jessica Rose-Clark - (UFC, Invicta, Titan)
  Ronda Rousey - (KOTC, UFC, Strikeforce)
  Montserrat Ruiz - (UFC, Invicta)

S
  Aya Saeid Saber - (OneFC, Kunlun)
  Sumie Sakai
  Colleen Schneider - (Strikeforce, SFL)
  Sarah Schneider - (Invicta, PFC)
  Lacey Schuckman - (Strikeforce, Invicta, Cage Warriors)
  Sabriye Şengül - (Bellator)
  Rosi Sexton - (Bellator, ShoXC, UFC, CWFC)
  Marina Shafir (Invicta)
  Antonina Shevchenko (UFC)
  Valentina Shevchenko (UFC, Legacy)
  Satoko Shinashi - (Shooto, Smackgirl, DEEP, RoadFC)
  Dayana Silva - (Bellator)
  Mayra Bueno Silva - (UFC)
  Tessa Simpson - (Invicta)
  Leslie Smith - (Invicta, Bellator, UFC)
  Tiffany van Soest - (Invicta)
  Pam Sorenson - (Invicta, KOTC)
  Simona Soukupova - (Invicta)
  Ketlen Souza - (Invicta)
  Livia Renata Souza - (Invicta, UFC)
  Lisa Spangler - (Invicta)
   Felicia Spencer - (Invicta, UFC)
  Christine Stanley - (Invicta)
  Julija Stoliarenko - (UFC, Invicta)
  Tatiana Suarez - (UFC)
  Naho Sugiyama - (Invicta, JEWELS)
  Shizuka Sugiyama - (JEWELS, DEEP, Rizin)

T

  Chommanee Sor Taehiran
  Yoko Takahashi - (EliteXC, Smackgirl)
  Yasuko Tamada - (JEWELS, Shooto, Smackgirl, DEEP, Invicta)
  Keiko Tamai - (Smackgirl, ShoXC)
  Jennifer Tate - (ShoXC)
  Miesha Tate - (UFC, Strikeforce)
  Danielle Taylor - (UFC, KOTC)
  Lauren Taylor - (UFC, Invicta, Legacy)
  Tharoth Sam - (OneFC)
  Herica Tiburcio - (Invicta)
  Tecia Torres - (UFC, Invicta)
  Jeet Toshi - (OneFC)
  Erin Toughill - (Smackgirl, PFC)
  Yuka Tsuji - (Smackgirl, JEWELS, DEEP)
  Charmaine Tweet - (Invicta)

V
  Paige VanZant - (UFC, Invicta)
  Kerry Vera - (Bellator, Strikeforce)
  Ana Carolina Vidal - (Invicta)
  Polyana Viana - (UFC)
  Ketlen Vieira - (UFC)

W
   Brogan Walker-Sanchez - (Invicta)
  Michelle Waterson - (UFC, Invicta, Strikeforce, KOTC)
  Emily Whitmire - (UFC)
  Danyelle Wolf - (UFC)
  Wu Yanan - (UFC, Kunlun)

X
  Xiong Jingnan - (OneFC, Kunlun)

Y
  Megumi Yabushita - (Smackgirl, JEWELS, Pancrase, Shooto)
  Yoko Yamada - (Smackgirl, JEWELS)
  Mei Yamaguchi - (Smackgirl, JEWELS, VTJ, DEEP, OneFC)
  Hiroko Yamanaka - (Smackgirl, JEWELS, Invicta, Strikeforce)
  Yan Xiaonan - (UFC, Road FC)
  Miyuu Yamamoto - (Rizin)
  Duda Yankovich - (Invicta)
  Ashley Yoder - (Invicta, UFC)
  Kaitlin Young - (Invicta, EliteXC)
  Shanna Young - (Invicta, UFC)

Z
  Denice Zamboanga - (OneFC)
  Alesha Zappitella - (Invicta)
  Cat Zingano - (Invicta, UFC)
  Weili Zhang - (UFC, Kunlun)

See also
List of male mixed martial artists
List of undefeated mixed martial artists
List of female boxers
List of female kickboxers
Ultimate Fighting Championship Pound for Pound rankings

Female mixed martial artists
Female mixed martial artists
Mixed martial artists, Female